Marsz Gwardii Ludowej, or Pieśń Partyzantów,  also known as My ze spalonych wsi is a Polish partisan song, anthem of GL and AL. The song was written by Wanda Zieleńczyk, a Polish communist poet and member of GL, in 1942.

Lyrics

See also
 Role of music in World War II
 Polish underground culture during World War II

References

External links
 Gwardii Ludowej - english subtitles on YouTube

Polish songs
Songs of World War II
Political party songs
Protest songs
Polish resistance during World War II